Fasih-ur-Rehman Munnan Khan was an Indian politician, social worker, and social activist who was also MP from Balrampur, Uttar Pradesh in 9th Lok Sabha.

History 
He was born on 7 January 1945 in Gonda, Uttar Pradesh and popularly known as Munnan Khan. His son's name is Muhammad Kasim Khan.

Career 
He served as member of parliament in the years of 1985-89, MLA from Katra Bazar Assembly constituency in 1985 (Lokdal), and member of consultative committee of ministry of labour and welfare in 1990 CE. He also wrote a book titled Ae-lane Jung (a book on public problem). He was a social worker as well.

References 

1945 births
People from Gonda, Uttar Pradesh
India MPs 1984–1989
Lok Sabha members from Uttar Pradesh
Living people